St Andrew's Brighton is the oldest continuous Anglican church in Victoria, Australia. St Andrew's is the Anglican parish church of the beachside suburb of Brighton, Melbourne.

Opened on St Andrew's Day in 1842, St Andrew's was one of the earliest Christian churches established in the Port Phillip District and predates both the Anglican Diocese of Melbourne and the colony, now state, of Victoria. Located in a large historic precinct in Middle Brighton, including a rare pre-gold rush graveyard, St Andrew's is one of Australia's most notable churches, known for its liturgical and musical tradition since the mid 19th century.

The present building, opened in 1962, was designed by the noted Australian architect Louis Williams to become the cathedral for the proposed Diocese of the Mornington Peninsula following the planned division of the Diocese of Melbourne. Although the Melbourne diocese remained intact, St Andrew's was completed to be one of the largest church buildings in Australia; its vast and versatile space has been described as the "Cathedral of Light".

St Andrew's Brighton maintains close and historic ties with both Brighton Grammar School and Firbank Grammar School.

Location

Set amidst an extensive landscaped historic precinct 500 metres from the Brighton beach, the land of St Andrew's Brighton is on the eastern side of New Street in Middle Brighton. The church lent its name to the other property boundaries to the south and east: Church Street and St Andrews Street. To the north, St Andrew's grounds border Brighton Grammar School, as in the 1920s the school received in trust five acres of the original ten acres of land granted to the church in 1841.

The main church car parking area is entered from New Street, to the north of the corner of Church and New Streets; the entry to the car park is at the site of the rustic timber lych gate, built to the west of the church in 1926 in the Arts and Crafts style and possibly designed by Louis Williams.

Early history: 1840
In 1840, the first recorded church services at Waterville, as the Brighton area was then known, were held in a tent. In May 1841, ten acres of land were set aside as a Church of England Reserve in the "Brighton Estate" planned by Henry Dendy and Jonathan Binns Were. This "Church Reserve" site was located in the planned small township of fashionable crescents, between the outer crescent and desirable allotments that ran to Port Phillip Bay.

Opening on St Andrew's Day: 1842
In 1842, the first St Andrew's Church building was opened on 30 November. As the day of the opening of the first church building was dedicated to Saint Andrew in the church calendar, the parish was named St Andrew's. Although St Andrew's Brighton was the second Anglican church established in the Port Phillip District, following the elevation of St James’ Church, Melbourne to Cathedral status in 1848 and the subsequent closure of the St James’ Old Cathedral building in 1912 and the consequent removal of the building to new land in West Melbourne in 1913–1914, St Andrew's Brighton has the longest continuous history of any Anglican church in Victoria. The Revd Adam Compton Thomson, the only Anglican priest in the Port Phillip District at the time, opened the first building and was the first to minister to the Brighton congregation.

Graveyard: 1843

On 24 October 1843, the two-acre St Andrew's Graveyard, established to the north-east of the first building, was consecrated by Bishop William Grant Broughton, the first and only Bishop of Australia. The graveyard was the first portion of the existing church land to be used for religious purposes and is a rare surviving example in Victoria of a pre-gold rush graveyard.  The first burial took place the following year, well before the opening of the Brighton General Cemetery in 1855, and St Andrew's Cemetery was the major burial ground for the district. More than 300 burials took place, mostly before 1860, and the graves of many district pioneers are located in the graveyard. After over 100 years of interments, the last burial took place in 1948. However, the adjoining garden of remembrance, established in 1953, remains in use. Melbourne's oldest churchyard cemetery, the St Andrew's Graveyard is one of only four remaining churchyard cemeteries in Melbourne.

Original buildings

First church and school building: 1842
Opened on St Andrew's Day, 30 November 1842, this small stone building, erected to the south of the present site in 1842 as No. 1 St Andrews Street, was used as a church and school. However, the north-western extension of Church Street, from St Andrews Street to the junction with New Street, isolated the southern portion of the "Church Reserve" from the main site soon after construction. This southern portion was not conveyed to the church in 1843 and other development took place on that land. The building seated 100 people, about 20% of the local population of 500, and was one of the first church buildings in the south-eastern mainland of the Diocese of Australia. In 1843, it was recorded that 75 pupils were enrolled at the newly established St Andrew's School, which was officially opened as School No. 44 in 1849 by Church of England authorities.

Second church building: 1850
 On 29 August 1850, The Right Reverend Charles Perry, Bishop of Melbourne, laid the foundation stone for a rectangular ironstone church, designed by architect, Melbourne city surveyor and St Andrew's parishioner, Charles Laing. This building was erected to the north-west of the St Andrew's Graveyard, featured plastered brick reveals and trims, was Gothic Revival in style and included a tower that was never built in the scheme.  Seating 250 people, it was opened on 12 October 1851 by The Revd William Brickwood, Vicar from 1849 to 1853. In the late 1920s, the present Vicarage was built on the site of this second church building.

Third church building and school house: 1857
 By 1857, the congregation had outgrown the second church building.  The parishioner, Brighton resident and prolific Melbourne architect Charles Webb, and his partner Thomas Taylor, were commissioned to design a new bluestone church, school house and vicarage. "King Webb" designed the new bluestone church in the Early English Gothic style, with a prominent bellcote surmounting the gable, a small gabled western entrance porch, a seven-bay nave and small chancel. Webb's building was considered "one of the more perfect examples of a church of the period in the Colony" and the majority of the building, including the distinctive western facade, remains a Brighton landmark.

 The ironstone church building was demolished and some of the stone used in the construction of a T-shaped school house building. St Andrew's School, originally established in the first small wooden church building 15 years earlier, continued to operate in this ironstone school building until 1875 when students were relocated to a new school in Brighton, established after the state school system was introduced in 1872. The school house was then used for Sunday School and other church activities.

In 1886, a north wing was added to the school house building, creating the symmetrical H-shaped building which survives today. Designed in a Gothic Revival style, the symmetrical H-shaped school house is constructed of random coursed, locally quarried ironstone and is roofed in slate. It has projecting gabled end wings, a central projecting entry porch and render detailing that includes parapets, finials, angle buttresses, window and door surrounds and gable vents. When additions were made to the church building in 1886, the altar and furnishings from the demolition of the chancel were installed in the central space of the school house. The building is currently used as a café and coffee shop.

St Andrew's School House is of architectural and historical significance to the State of Victoria as one of the few surviving examples of Charles Webb's distinctive institutional buildings, as a rare example of a building constructed of local ironstone and as a rare surviving example of a substantial early denominational school building.

Third church building enlargement: 1886
 In the 1860s and 1870s, Brighton further expanded as a desirable beach-side suburb and by 1886 necessary additions were made to the church.

Large sandstone transepts and an apsidal chancel were added to the existing bluestone church by 'probably the best known figure in the architectural profession in Melbourne', architect Lloyd Tayler.  Built in the High Victorian Gothic style, and constructed of Oamaru limestone from New Zealand, Charles Webb's bluestone church served as the nave in the enlarged building.

 As the simpler Early English Gothic and decorated High Victorian Gothic architectural styles were not considered visually compatible, there was provision for either replacing the bluestone nave, or cladding it in Oamaru limestone to complement the transepts and chancel.

The 1886 Lloyd Tayler interior featured elaborate woodwork in the sanctuary fittings including a large rood screen and divided choir stalls, and magnificent stained glass windows in the transepts and chancel.  The designs for Tayler's additions, opened in August 1886 and costing £7,000 – a substantial sum for the time, were clearly influenced by the most prolific 19th century Gothic Revivalists, including A.W.N. Pugin and Sir George Gilbert Scott.

Parish hall: 1928
 In 1928, St Andrew's Parish Hall, designed by architect Louis Williams, was built to the east of the 19th century school house building. This large Arts and Crafts-influenced building facing St Andrews Street is constructed of clinker brick and the symmetrical front facade contains a broad central jerkinhead gable roof.

The exposed brick interior of the building contains oversized timber hammer beam trusses and large folding timber doors that line both sides of the central hall. All timberwork remains unpainted.  The Parish Hall is used daily by numerous organizations for a large variety of events.

Fire: 1961
In 1954, over 70 years after the construction of the transepts and chancel, the nave of Lloyd Tayler's grand design for the church building had not been completed, and proposals were made by the noted Melbourne architect John F. D. Scarborough to demolish the 1857 bluestone building, still functioning as the nave, and rebuild a wider nave using the bluestone facings and arches.

Scarborough's proposals did not proceed, and the 1857 nave and 1886 transepts and chancel were largely destroyed by a devastating fire on Sunday evening 19 February 1961.  Given the nave timber ceiling over 100 years old, the fire quickly engulfed the building and the damage was such that a restoration was impractical, even had that been considered appropriate.

On 20 February 1961, the day following the fire, the renowned Australian church architect and parishioner, Louis Williams, was appointed to be the architect for a new church building.

Present church complex: 1962
 The present St Andrew's Church complex is among the largest church buildings in Australasia. Using over 500,000 bricks and over 16,000 roof tiles, the versatile space consists of three major conjoined internal areas: the main church building, the Pioneer Chapel and the lady chapel.

The present church building, a Melbourne landmark, was dedicated on 15 December 1962 in the presence of the Governor of Victoria, Sir Dallas Brooks; Frank Woods, Anglican Archbishop of Melbourne; other clergy and two thousand people.

Main church
 As it was decided to retain the west end and four bays from the nave of Charles Webb's bluestone church built in 1857, the main section of the new church building, incorporating a new nave, transepts and sanctuary, was reorientated and set at a right angle to the bluestone building, so the new nave was built on a north–south axis rather than the traditional liturgical east–west.

Sir Edward Maufe’s design for Guildford Cathedral in England, consecrated in 1961, was held up as “an example of good taste” for the design of the new St Andrew's Church and many of Louis Williams' personal ecclesiastical design ideas are also apparent at St Andrew's. Williams retained “the traditional layout of an Anglican church favoured by ecclesiologists in the 19th century and following the pre-Reformation pattern”, and used a modern Gothic style for overall design with modern materials and construction methods. Williams had used this conservative approach frequently and successfully in other smaller buildings in suburban Melbourne and country Victoria.

 Williams’ desire for extremely generous planning is manifest throughout the main church with well-spaced pews, a clear view of the altar, wide aisles, a vast sanctuary and a large choir and organ gallery at the rear with a spacious narthex below. The narthex's low ceiling emphasises the height of the nave and sanctuary, "which is obvious as one enters the body of the church and the walls seem to rise in an impressive upsurge - 'an offering of height'."

The windowless recessed sanctuary wall, lit by concealed clear side windows, was originally intended to be enriched with a reredos of Venetian vitreous mosaic, "rising towards its summit in a stirring outburst of joyous, expressive colour". The commissioning of this large and colourful mosaic, however, was deferred and finished instead with a large cross. The sanctuary recess now features a bronze sculpture of the prodigal son by Guy Boyd below this "temporary" cross.  The sculpture was installed in 1987, the new church building's 25th anniversary.

 The main church building, of cruciform shape with shallow transepts, has a steel frame; red autumn-tinted "ripple-tex" brick was used for the exterior and hard-faced "oatmeal"-coloured cream brick for the interior.  The dimensions are spacious: the building is almost 200 feet long and the nave is nearly 50 feet high with a distinctive ceiling of golden anodised aluminium tiles. Externally, the copper flèche over the crossing is nearly 120 feet high.

The nave of the present building, the “Cathedral of Light”, is a vast light-filled space. Large stained glass windows and travertine piers dominate the cream brick walls; clear glass doors, placed the entire length of one side of the nave, open to the cloister garden.

Many artistic features in the main building are the result of the close collaboration between Louis Williams and the Dutch-Australian artist Rein Slagmolen of Vetrart Studios, including the brass representations of the Four Evangelists on the 'Polylite' pulpit and lectern panels, the copper font cover featuring a dove and vine leaves, and the "Tree of Life" west window.

Using the German-made "antique" stained glass favoured by Williams, the windows in the nave are toned from quiet and cooler colours to richer and warmer colours as they progress to the sanctuary and the intended artistic highlight of the main building, the vibrant and multi-coloured sanctuary mosaic. The stained glass in the main building is non-figurative, relying instead on the colour gradation of the leadlight to imply symbolic references.

The sanctuary and baptistery windows are predominantly deep blues, greens and reds, while the large Tree of Life west window, by Rein Slagmolen, at the opposite end of the building, uses cool blues at the base rising to warm golds at the top of the window.

 The west window tracery was designed to suggest the branching of a tree; the impression is enhanced by the inclusion of leaf-shaped russet-coloured glass at the apex of the window and the large double-winged organ cases branching out from the "tree".

 The south transept features a large and richly traceried rose window above the exposed pipework of the transept division of the pipe organ; the rose window tracery, with its "leaf-like pattern" also provides a subtle link to the Tree of Life west window.

The interior of the main church building stands as a testament to Williams’ intention to make the present St Andrew's nave “a symphony of light and colour” as distant as possible from the “dim religious light of the Victorian era”.

All the furniture and furnishings within the church building were made to Williams' designs, and represent one of the largest collections of mid 20th century ecclesiastical furniture in Australia.

Pioneer Chapel
 The old bluestone nave built in 1857, in Early English Gothic style and typical of the work of Charles Webb, remains as the Pioneer Memorial Chapel. In 1961, in order to reconcile the proportions of the old bluestone nave and convert it to its present use as a chapel and baptistery, three bays of the original seven-bay bluestone nave were demolished.

  Externally, the Pioneer Chapel is linked to the narthex of the new building by a large arcaded cloister with an internal cloister garden, extremely rare in any cathedral or church in Australasia.

Significantly, the original west end of the 1857 bluestone church building, a distinctive Brighton landmark with its prominent bellcote, bracketed string course, triple lancet window tracery, pinnacled corner buttresses and original main entrance porch remains as the symmetrical western façade of the Pioneer Chapel.

As the original triple lancet west window was destroyed in the 1961 fire, the opportunity was taken to commission a mural from the leading one-armed Australian muralist Napier Waller to complete the internal western wall of the chapel; externally, the stone tracery remains with blacked-in stone. The Pioneer Memorial Mural depicts the “pioneers of Brighton landing from Port Phillip Bay and setting about the task of building a new church.”

Lady Chapel
This intimate space, to the north-west of the crossing in the main church, was designed as the Chapel of the Incarnation. The stained glass windows by David Taylor Kellock, a Scottish-trained Ballarat artist favoured by Louis Williams, represent “the work of Christ and His Church in the redemption of the world in all its aspects”.

The Lady Chapel windows are among the most successful examples of Kellock's work; the repetition of the "Tree of Life" west window "tree-form" tracery within the stained glass unifies these figurative windows with the non-figurative windows of the main building and gave Kellock the basic composition for each scene.

In addition to the six Kellock stained glass windows, the Lady Chapel also houses a notable dossal (“The Crowning of the Virgin”) and altar frontal (“There is a Green Hill far away”) by Beryl Dean, the leading ecclesiastical textile artist.

Relationship with local schools
Over the course of Brighton Grammar School's history, it has used St Andrew's Church as the main location for its weekly chapel services and musical recitals. The other prominent private school in Brighton, Firbank Grammar School, has had a similar relationship.

Both of these schools offer the St Andrew's Choir scholarship to those students with musical ability and willingness to participate in the St Andrew's Choir.

Both of the school crests are part of the 'west' entryway flooring ornamentation.

Clergy
Many of the vicars of St Andrew's Church have been appointed bishops after their ministry at St Andrew's. Since 1980, the vicars of St Andrew's have formerly been deans of cathedrals in dioceses in Tasmania, New South Wales and New Zealand.

Vicars of St Andrew's Brighton

 1842-1848: The Revd Adam Compton Thomson
 1849-1853: The Revd William Brickwood
 1853-1889: The Revd Samuel Taylor (the parish's longest serving vicar; Taylor was vicar for 36 years)
 1889-1892: Canon William Chalmers (later Bishop of Goulburn, New South Wales)
 1892-1894: The Revd John "Jack" Stretch (later Bishop of Newcastle, New South Wales)
 1894-1899: The Revd Reginald Stephen (later Bishop of Tasmania and then Bishop of Newcastle),
 1899-1913: The Revd Edward Crawford
 1913-1917: The Revd Archibald Law (later vicar of St John's Church, Toorak, Melbourne)
 1918-1928: Canon William Hancock (later Archdeacon of Melbourne)
 1928-1948: The Venerable Harold Hewett
 1949-1951: The Revd Donald Redding MBE (later Bishop of Bunbury and Coadjutor Bishop of Melbourne)
 1952-1965: The Venerable George "Bill" Codrington
 1966-1969: The Revd Ross Border
 1969-1973: The Revd David Shand (later Bishop of St Arnaud, Victoria)
 1974-1979: The Revd Don Hardy
 1980-1993: The Revd Harlin Butterley (formerly Dean of St David's Cathedral, Hobart, Tasmania)
 1993-2003: The Revd Ken Hewlett (formerly Dean of Bathurst Cathedral, New South Wales)
 2004-2011: The Revd Kenyon McKie (formerly Dean of Goulburn Cathedral, New South Wales)
 2012–2019: The Revd Canon Jan Joustra (formerly Dean of St Peter's Cathedral, Hamilton, New Zealand)
 2019–present: The Revd Ian Morrison (formerly Archdeacon of Box Hill at Anglican Diocese of Melbourne & Parish Priest of Holy Trinity Anglican Church Surrey Hills)

Associate clergy

Many clergy have served at St Andrew's Brighton as associate priests. In recent years, retired clergy have also been assisting in the parish in addition to the associate priests.

 The Revd Richard Harvey (1992-1994) (former curate at St John's Camberwell from 1989 to 1991 in Melbourne and St Stephen's Belmont from 1991 to 1992 in Geelong, Harvey served as assistant priest from 1992 to 1994 at Brighton; he is now residing in New South Wales since 1994 and a full-time teacher, but he continues to be a volunteer associate priest at Holy Trinity, Terrigal as of 2012)
 The Revd Judith Marriott (now serving in Beaumaris)
 The Revd Sam Goodes
 The Revd Chris Lancaster
 The Revd Emily Fraser
 The Revd Andrew Esnouf
 The Revd Victor Fan
 The Revd Christine Croft
 The Revd Michelle Wang

Organists and Directors of Music
St Andrew's Brighton has the longest continual musical tradition of any institution in Victoria and The Choir of St Andrew's Brighton is Victoria's oldest Choir. St Andrew's Brighton had the first locally built pipe organ in the Port Phillip District; the instrument was opened in 1843 in the first church building and built by the first Organist of St Andrew's, Peter Hurlstone. Since then, many of Australia's leading musicians have held the position of Organist and Director of Music of St Andrew's Brighton.

Organists and Directors of Music of St Andrew's Brighton

 1842-1851: Peter Hurlstone (Educated at Oxford University, prominent early Colonist, later Councillor for the Municipality of Brighton) 
 1857-1858: George Robert Grant Pringle ("The leading organist in Melbourne")
 1858: William Beresford Wray (Formerly Organist of the Blind Asylum, Liverpool, UK; buried in the St Andrew's Graveyard)
 1858-1859: George Robert Grant Pringle
 1859-1861: Thomas Green Goold (Formerly Organist of St James' Cathedral, Melbourne) 
 1861: William Beresford Wray
 1861-1862: Thomas Green Goold
 1862-1867: John Ashcroft Edwards (Later Organist of All Saints' Church, St Kilda, Melbourne) 
 1867-1868: Edward D. Goodliffe
 1870: George Robert Grant Pringle
 1870-1877: Julius Herz (Prominent German-born conductor, composer and organist)
 1879-1880: Madame Carlotta Tasca (Born Charlotte Tasker; King's Scholar of the Royal Academy in London; prominent concert pianist and organist) 
 1880-1885: David Lee (First Melbourne City Organist)
 1885-1888: Robert Rudland Bode (Formerly Assistant Organist of Wells Cathedral, UK and Organist of St George's Cathedral, Perth, Western Australia. Later Organist of St Andrew's Cathedral, Honolulu, Hawaii)
 1888-1889: Frank Henry Bradley (Formerly Organist of the Alexandra Palace, London, UK. "The greatest concert organist to visit Australia since W.T. Best")
 1889-1892: William Davies Evans (Organist)
 1889-1890: J. Gladstone Wright (Choirmaster) ("The great Australian baritone") 
 1890-1892: Alfred H. Gee (Choirmaster) 
 1893: Arnold Robert Kelsey (Organist) (Formerly Organist of St Matthew's Church, Dunedin, NZ; businessman, music seller and promoter)
 1893: Alfred H. Gee (Choirmaster)
 1894-1902: Arnold Robert Kelsey
 1903-1904: Horace Percy Finnis (Later Organist of St John's Church, Toorak and St Peter's Cathedral, Adelaide; Priest, Organist and Composer)
 1904-1908: John Romanis (Town Clerk and City Treasurer of the City of Prahran, Orrong Romanis Reserve is named in his memory)
 1908-1915: Jeannie Bruce Pensom 
 1915-1916: C. George Herbert (Leading Ballarat organist and music teacher)
 1916-1941: George Leonard Talbot (Professor of Voice Production, Singing, Piano and Organ, also Sub Organist of St Paul's Cathedral, Melbourne) 
 1941-1953: William Burrell (Leading Australian accompanist and pianist and Grand Organist of the United Grand Lodge of Victoria)
 1953-1956: Donald White (Also Music Master of Brighton Grammar School) 
 1956-1961: John Miles Barrett (Also Music Master of Brighton Grammar School, later Organist of St Paul's Church, Manuka, ACT and Director of Music of Canberra Grammar School)
 1961-1975: Ian Locksley Thomas (Also Music Master of Brighton Grammar School. Designer of the War Memorial Grand Organ. Later Organist of St John's Church, Toorak)
 1975-1996: Lindsay Arthur O’Neill (Formerly Organist of St John's Church, Launceston, Tasmania and leading Australian organist, teacher and improviser)
 1996-2005: Dr Ian Burk (Formerly Organist and Master of the Choristers of St David's Cathedral, Hobart)
 2006: Rodney Ford (Acting Organist) (Director of Music of Brighton Grammar School)
 2006-2014: Thomas Francis Healey (Formerly Director of Music of Geelong Grammar School)
 2014–2019: Thomas Scott Heywood
 2019–2020: Christopher Roache
 2020–present: Dr Calvin Bowman

Organs
St Andrew's Brighton has the longest continual tradition of pipe organs and organ music in Victoria. Since 1843, there have been five instruments installed in the four St Andrew's church buildings, and one instrument installed in the St Andrew's School House building between 1876 and 1879.

1843: Peter Hurlstone, Melbourne

In 1843, the first pipe organ in the earliest St Andrew's building was the first locally-built pipe organ in what is now the State of Victoria and only the third pipe organ to be heard in a public building in south-eastern mainland Australia. It was built by the first Organist of St Andrew's, Peter Hurlstone. Hurlstone had also assembled the Port Phillip District's earlier two pipe organs in the previous year. The Hurlstone instrument was moved to the second church building in 1850 and repaired in 1855 by Henry Smith, from the Bristol firm of John Smith & Sons, resident in Melbourne at the time. In 1855 and 1856, the instrument was again repaired and also enlarged by English immigrant organ builder Jesse Biggs. It is almost certain that this instrument survives, in its enlarged form, in St Luke's Lutheran Church, Cavendish.

1857: Jesse Biggs, Melbourne

In 1857, the 1843 Hurlstone instrument, having been moved again, this time into the third church building, was sold. The proceeds were used to purchase a completely new instrument built by Jesse Biggs in 1857. On Monday 23 November 1857, The Age newspaper reported ‘Organ Performance. On Wednesday last [18 November 1857] Mr W.B. Wray, late organist of the Blind Asylum, Liverpool, gave a selection of music by the great composers on the new and beautiful instrument just finished by Mr Biggs, at his manufactory, in Little Lonsdale street, west. Several of our leading musical connoisseurs were present by invitation and expressed themselves highly delighted with the power and tone of the organ, as well as with the masterly performance of the organist. The instrument reflects the highest credit on the builder, and we must congratulate the good people of Brighton on becoming its possessors. Mr Wray, we believe, was induced to come to this colony for the benefit of his health, and we sincerely hope he may be induced to remain. An organist and teacher of his reputation would be an immense acquisition to this metropolis, particularly as our churches are now becoming fitted with organs of magnitude and first rate quality.’

1860: Hill & Son, London

In 1860, the 1857 Biggs instrument was sold and a chamber organ, built by the leading London organ building firm of Hill & Son for a local residence in 1858, was purchased following an auction of the first owner's property. Placed originally in a gallery at the west end of the church, surviving today as the west end of the Pioneer Chapel, the Hill & Son organ was moved to a new organ chamber in the new chancel in 1886. The instrument was too small for the enlarged building and, although other instruments were considered over the following decades, it was not until 1918 that it was finally an ‘urgent necessity’ the Hill & Son instrument be replaced. The opportunity was taken to dedicate the planned new instrument as a memorial to parishioners from St Andrew's who had died in the First World War. The Hill & Son organ survives, in basically original condition, in St Peter's Lutheran Church, Stawell.
 
1923: W.L. Roberts, Melbourne and Adelaide

Although a contract was signed with the leading Australian organ building firm of J. E. Dodd for a large three-manual organ in July 1920, this contract was cancelled by St Andrew's in October 1922 after a significant delay in the planned building of the instrument. In January 1923, the contract was signed for a new Memorial Organ with the Australian organ building firm of William Leopold Roberts. This large three-manual instrument was dedicated in 1924 and designed by the Organist of St Andrew's: George L. Talbot, who acted as Consultant for the project. It was placed in matching divided cases of Tasmanian oak, designed by architect Louis R. Williams, on either side of the large south transept window. The organ console was placed in the former organ chamber to the south side of the chancel.

The instrument was of note as one of the largest instruments built by W.L. Roberts. The wooden pipework was locally manufactured, but the metal pipework was imported from the UK: the reed stops from Proctors of Leeds, and all the metal flue stops from Rogers of Leeds. Roberts had trained with J.J. Binns of Leeds and was familiar with the high-quality work of these trade pipework suppliers. The instrument had tubular-pneumatic key, coupler and stop action together with a full manual key compass of 61 notes and a full pedal key compass of 32 notes.

After nearly four decades of regular use, this instrument was completely destroyed in the fire of 19 February 1961.

Specification of the 1923 Memorial Organ (W.L. Roberts, Ltd: 1923)

War Memorial Grand Organ
1962-64: Davis & Laurie, Melbourne

Following the devastating fire in February 1961 which destroyed the third church building and previous Memorial Organ, the new four-manual War Memorial Grand Organ, designed by the Organist of St Andrew's: Ian L. Thomas, was dedicated on Easter Day 1964 in the newly rebuilt ‘Cathedral of Light’. It has been played almost daily ever since for services, concerts, weddings, funerals, lessons and recordings.

Australian-made between 1962 and 1964 by the Melbourne firm of Davis & Laurie, the instrument is a memorial to Australians killed in the 20th century's two World Wars. There are nearly 3,000 pipes and 64 speaking stops speaking into ‘one of the most beautiful acoustics’ in Australia. One of Australasia's landmark musical instruments, at the time of its opening the War Memorial Grand Organ aroused much attention as one of the most exciting new instruments in Australasia. It was the subject of many enthusiastic reviews both around Australasia and internationally.

The organ is one of very few in the world with twin four-manual consoles. It also has a full-length 32’ wooden reed: the ‘Contra Bombarde’. Contemporaneous with the large locally-built instrument in St Patrick's Cathedral, Melbourne opened three months after the War Memorial Grand Organ, the instrument was the first in Australasia to have a horizontal reed stop ‘en chamade’ – the ‘Festal Trumpet’. The Gallery and Transept divisions are over 100 feet apart, giving inspirational ‘stereo’ antiphonal effects.

Specification of the War Memorial Grand Organ (Davis & Laurie: 1962–64)

Electro-pneumatic and electro-mechanical key, coupler and stop action. Compass: 61/32. 64 levels of adjustable General and Divisional memory.

References

Anglican church buildings in Melbourne
1842 establishments in Australia
Religious organizations established in 1840
Gothic Revival architecture in Melbourne
Gothic Revival church buildings in Australia
Buildings and structures in the City of Bayside
Churches completed in 1962